Veritas is the first album from Veritas. It was released through Fair Trade Services on September 9, 2014. Veritas worked with Kent Hooper and Phillip Keveren in the production of this album.

Reception

In a three star out of five review for CCM Magazine, Grace S. Aspinwall describes the album as "Possibly one of the most diverse and intriguing projects this year... Truly remarkable work from the quartet". Caitlin Lassiter, writes a four star album review for New Release Tuesday, realizing, "this album seems to have it all. Backed by smooth vocals that blend beautifully from start to finish and pitch-perfect harmonies, the group has mastered an unmistakable new sound - a sound that could very well be a breath of fresh air into the world of Christian music." Awarding the album three and a half stars at 365 Days of Inspiring Media, Joshua Andre says, "Veritas’ debut album has done is widen my musical horizons so that I can appreciate songs outside of my genre without loving them more than other tracks."

Track listing

Charts

References

2014 albums
Fair Trade Services albums